Aram Hasanzada (born April 22, 1994) is an Kurdish-Finnish footballer.

Career statistics

References

1994 births
Living people
Finnish footballers
Iranian footballers
Finnish people of Iranian descent
Finnish people of Kurdish descent
JJK Jyväskylä players
Kokkolan Palloveikot players
Veikkausliiga players
Ykkönen players
Kakkonen players
Sportspeople of Iranian descent
Kurdish sportspeople
Association football midfielders